The 2017 Women's EuroHockey Junior Championships was the 18th edition of the Women's EuroHockey Junior Championship, an under 21 women's field hockey tournament. It was held in Valencia, Spain between 28 August and 3 September 2017.

Netherlands won the tournament by defeating Belgium 6–0 in the final. England won the bronze medal by defeating Germany 3–2 in the third-place playoff.

Qualified teams
Italy withdrew before the tournament.

Results

Preliminary round

Pool A

Pool B

Classification round

Pool C
 The match between Ireland and Spain was cancelled due to illness; as a result no teams were relegated.

First to fourth place classification

Semi-finals

Third and fourth place

Final

Statistics

Awards

Final standings

Goalscorers

See also
2017 Men's EuroHockey Junior Championship
2017 Women's EuroHockey Nations Championship

References

Women's EuroHockey Junior Championship
Junior
EuroHockey Junior Championship
EuroHockey Junior Championship
International women's field hockey competitions hosted by Spain
EuroHockey Junior Championship
EuroHockey Junior Championship
EuroHockey Championship
Sports competitions in Valencia
21st century in Valencia